Savyolovskaya, alternatively transliterated Savelovskaya, is a station on Serpukhovsko-Timiryazevskaya Line of the Moscow Metro. It opened on 31 December 1988 and was the northern terminus of the line until an extension in 1991 pushed the terminus out to Otradnoye.

The entrance vestibule is on the main square in front of Savyolovsky rail terminal, from which the station gets its name. Connections at the rail terminal provide access to commuter trains serving destinations to the north of Moscow.

Passengers are able to transfer to and from an identically named station on the Bolshaya Koltsevaya line since 30 December 2018.

References

External links 
 metro.ru
 KartaMetro.info — Station location and exits on Moscow map (English/Russian)

Moscow Metro stations
Railway stations in Russia opened in 1988
Serpukhovsko-Timiryazevskaya Line
Railway stations located underground in Russia